Florida's 16th congressional district is an electoral district for the U.S. Congress which encompasses eastern Hillsborough County and the entirety of Manatee County. In the 2020 redistricting cycle, the district was drawn out of Sarasota and Sarasota County to include more of Tampa's eastern suburbs, including Riverview and parts of Brandon south of Florida State Road 60.

The district is currently represented by Republican Vern Buchanan.

History
The 16th district was created as a result of the redistricting cycle after the 1980 Census.

When the Florida legislature redistricted in 2002 after the 2000 U.S. Census, a federal court described the boundaries of the 16th Congressional District and the interlocking 23rd Congressional District as an example of gerrymandering and a "raw exercise of majority legislative power."

From 2013 to 2017, the district includes Sarasota County and most of Manatee County. After court-ordered redistricting for the 2016 elections, the district was moved northwards to include southern Hillsborough County, while southern Sarasota County was moved into the 17th district.

Voting

List of members representing the district

Election results

2002

2004

2006

The seat became vacant after Foley's sudden resignation on September 29, 2006, after it became public that he had sent inappropriate emails to male teenage former congressional pages. Foley's resignation occurred too late under Florida law to take his name off the ballot. Therefore, Foley's name remained on the ballot, but votes cast for him went to his replacement, State Representative Joe Negron, who would have been duly elected had Foley won the November 7, 2006 election. Since Mahoney won the election, the question did not arise.

2008

Incumbent Tim Mahoney ran for reelection in 2008. His opponent was Tom Rooney, a former JAG officer, Special Assistant United States Attorney, and professor at the United States Military Academy. Rooney is also the grandson of the founder of the Pittsburgh Steelers. While Mahoney was initially favored, after the scandal involving his mistress, the race shifted toward "likely Republican" on the Cook Political Report.

2010

2012

2014

2016

2018

2020

2022

Historical district boundaries

The former 16th district in 2003–2012 stretched from the Gulf of Mexico to the Atlantic Coast and included parts of Charlotte, Glades, Hendry, Highlands, Okeechobee, St. Lucie, Martin, and Palm Beach counties. Included within the district were Port Charlotte, Port St. Lucie, and Palm Beach.

References

 Congressional Biographical Directory of the United States 1774–present

External links
2000 Census Data
OpenSecrets.org's summary of spending for the 2006 race

16
Charlotte County, Florida
Glades County, Florida
Hendry County, Florida
Highlands County, Florida
Martin County, Florida
Okeechobee County, Florida
Palm Beach County, Florida
St. Lucie County, Florida
1983 establishments in Florida